Jessica Ramsey (born July 26, 1991) is an American shot putter. She won the bronze medal in the women's shot put event at the 2019 Pan American Games held in Lima, Peru.

From Boynton Beach, Florida, she went to Western Kentucky University to study Social and Behavioral Science. She became the first woman from Western Kentucky ever to qualify for the NCAA Outdoor Track and Field Championships in three separate individual events: discus, shot put and hammer throw.

At the 2019 Shanghai IAAF Diamond League meet she finished 4th in the shot put competition.
In Marietta, Georgia on August 29, 2020 Ramsey threw  which put her in the top 10 for the year worldwide for the shot put in 2020.

At the Olympic Trials on 24 June 2021, Ramsey threw a US Olympic Trials Championships Record to win the women's shot put .

Competition record

College
Ramsey is a 6-time All-American in college while she represented Western Kentucky University and South Plains College. Ramsey won 7 Sun Belt Conference titles in the Shot Put, Hammer, Discus, and Weight throw as a Western Kentucky Lady Toppers.

Ramsey holds the Western Kentucky Lady Toppers school record in the outdoor shot put (Discus (2nd place in the hammer (Indoor shot put (Weight Throw.

Prep
Ramsey is a 2010 graduate of Boynton Beach Community High School in Boynton Beach, Florida where she set high school best Discus, Shot Put, 100 Meters (12.77), 200 Meters (28.30).

Ramsey set a Boynton Beach High School record in the discus which was broken in 2018 by Amber Powell. Ramsey holds a school record in the shot put.

References

External links 
 
 Team USA profile for Jessica Ramsey
 
 

Living people
1991 births
People from Boynton Beach, Florida
People from Palm Beach County, Florida
Sportspeople from Boynton Beach, Florida
Sportspeople from Miami-Dade County, Florida
Track and field athletes from Miami
American female shot putters
Athletes (track and field) at the 2019 Pan American Games
Medalists at the 2019 Pan American Games
Pan American Games bronze medalists for the United States
Pan American Games medalists in athletics (track and field)
Pan American Games track and field athletes for the United States
USA Outdoor Track and Field Championships winners
Athletes (track and field) at the 2020 Summer Olympics
Olympic track and field athletes of the United States
21st-century American women
20th-century American women